Dauphin Royal was a 104-gun ship of the line of the French Royal Navy. She was built at Toulon Dockyard, designed and constructed by François Pomet. She took part in the Battle of Beachy Head on 10 July 1690 (N.S.) and the Battle of Lagos on 28 June 1693, both times as flagship of Lieutenant-Général Louis-François de Rousselet, Comte de Châteaurenault, under Vice-Admiral Tourville. She was decommissioned in 1698 or 1699, and broken up in 1700.

Sources and references 

Nomenclature des Vaisseaux du Roi-Soleil de 1661 a 1715. Alain Demerliac (Editions Omega, Nice – various dates).
The Sun King's Vessels (2015) - Jean-Claude Lemineur; English translation by François Fougerat. Editions ANCRE.  
Winfield, Rif and Roberts, Stephen (2017) French Warships in the Age of Sail 1626-1786: Design, Construction, Careers and Fates. Seaforth Publishing. . 

 Vaisseaux de Ligne Français de 1682 à 1780 1

Ships of the line of the French Navy
1660s ships